Darryl Gerard Hickman (born July 28, 1931) is an American former actor, screenwriter, television executive, and acting coach. He started his career as a child actor in the Golden Age of Hollywood and appeared in numerous TV serials as an adult. He appeared in films such as The Grapes of Wrath (1940) and Leave Her to Heaven (1945).
 
He is the older brother of Dwayne Hickman, an actor, television executive, producer and director, and Deidre Hickman.

Child actor in the 1930s and 1940s
Hickman was born in Hollywood, California, to Milton and Katherine Hickman (née Ostertag). His father sold insurance and his mother was a housewife. His maternal grandfather, Louis Henry Ostertag, was a US Navy seaman on Commodore George Dewey's flagship, the cruiser USS Olympia (C-6), and present at the Battle of Manila Bay on May 1, 1898, for which he was awarded the Dewey Medal by Act of Congress. Per the 1940 Census, Darryl and his family were living with his grandparents at 950 Kenmore St., in Los Angeles. 

In the mid-1930s, Darryl was discovered by a dance-school director, and subsequently became a student there. The following year, Hollywood studio Paramount signed a contract with the child actor.  His first film role was as Ronald Colman's son in The Prisoner of Zenda in 1937. He attended Paramount's school in California and his classmates included Gene Nelson and Jackie Cooper.

In preparation for the 1939 Bing Crosby movie The Star Maker, Paramount casting agents, led by Leroy Prinz, interviewed more than a thousand children. Hickman won one of the parts in the film. Pleased with Hickman's performance, Crosby notified his older brother and talent agent Everett Crosby of the young actor.  After this, he went on to appear in multiple motion pictures throughout the 1930s and 1940s in a wide array of genres. A busy performer, he  sometimes worked on different films simultaneously.

In 1939, he was cast in 20th Century Fox's film adaption of John Steinbeck's best-selling novel from 1939, The Grapes of Wrath, starring Henry Fonda and directed by John Ford. He portrayed Winfield Joad, the youngest member of a family trying to cope with the hardships of the Great Depression.  The film was a critical and commercial success, with Ford winning an Academy Award for Best Director, while actress Jane Darwell won for Best Supporting Actress. In 1941, Hickman played a reform-school juvenile delinquent in Men of Boys Town, "almost running away [with his role] right under [co-star] Mickey Rooney's nose", said one review. Another notable role during this time included the wartime melodrama The Human Comedy, where he played a mentally slow child. Hickman made a featured appearance as Frank in the 1942 Our Gang comedy short "Going to Press". In 1944, he again played the bad-boy antagonist, cast opposite Jimmy Lydon's goody two-shoes character in the film Henry Aldrich, Boy Scout.

In 1946, he played the younger version of Van Heflin's character Sam Masterson in the film noir The Strange Love of Martha Ivers. To make it seem credible that Hickman looked like a young Van Heflin, the latter provided a picture of himself as a teenager to  makeup artist Wally Westmore.  In this period, he also acted alongside Gene Tierney and Cornel Wilde in the 1945 film Leave Her to Heaven. Being the sole survivor among the cast, he provided extra commentary in the DVD release of the movie. His experience of working with Tierney was mixed, considering her to have been aloof and not given her best performance, although it won her a nomination for the Academy Award for Best Actress. The year after the release of Leave Her to Heaven, Hickman was lauded by a newspaper as "one of Hollywood's top juveniles". Hickman later became critical of child acting, lamenting how the profession for young actors deprives them of a real childhood. He opted to get therapeutical assistance for several years to come to terms with his past.

Adult years as an actor
Hickman graduated from Cathedral High School in Los Angeles in 1948 (his brother Dwayne graduated from the same school in 1952). Finding it hard to adjust to adulthood after being in the limelight for most of his childhood, he retired from show business to enter a monastery in 1951 as a Passionist monk. He returned to Hollywood around one month later. He continued acting, but with fewer roles than he had at the peak of his career. One of his most notable roles during this time was as Al in the 1956 film Tea and Sympathy. He also began acting for the first time in the then-new entertainment medium of television. The switch did not always turn out successfully, for many shows were cancelled for various reasons in the early years of television.  Hickman's ongoing efforts to reinvigorate his acting career were interrupted for two years while he served in the United States Army from 1954 to 1956.

In 1959 and 1960, Hickman appeared on younger brother Dwayne Hickman's CBS sitcom The Many Loves of Dobie Gillis, playing his older brother Davey in three different episodes:  "The Right Triangle" (1959), "Deck the Halls" (1959), and "Where There's a Will" (1960).  Also in 1959 he starred twice in the TV Western Gunsmoke; as "Andy Hill" in the episode "The Choice" (S4E34) and as “Danny” in the episode “Target” (S5E1).  In 1961, Hickman starred in a short-lived TV series The Americans. In 1957, he played murderer Steve Harris in the Perry Mason episode "The Case of the Sleepwalker's Niece".  He appeared in two episodes of The Untouchables,  "You Can't Pick the Number" and "Pressure".  Aside from film and television, Hickman also starred in Broadway productions, such as the Pulitzer Prize-winning play How to Succeed in Business Without Really Trying in 1963, substituting for star Robert Morse.  In 1976, after a 17-year hiatus from movies, Hickman had a minor role as Bill Herron in  Network.

Television executive and acting coach
Hickman eventually became a television executive, producer, and occasional screenwriter, mainly working in New York City. He wrote the scripts for several 1961 episodes of The Loretta Young Show. In the early 1970s, Hickman was associate producer of the long-running soap opera Love of Life. He was also one of the producers of A Year at the Top with Norman Lear in 1977. During the production of the pilot episode for A Year at the Top, he reunited with guest-star Mickey Rooney, with whom he had acted in the Boys Town sequel Men of Boys Town in 1941.

Hickman's book about acting techniques, The Unconscious Actor: Out of Control, in Full Command, was published in April 2007. In it, he explains how his approach to acting evolved through his interactions with the various actors and directors with whom he worked over the years. One of his most important influences came from working with Spencer Tracy and George Cukor in the 1942 movie Keeper of the Flame. In another book written by James Curtis and published in 2011, Spencer Tracy: A Biography, Hickman's admiration for Tracy and Cukor is again documented. He praises the two men's patience in that biography, as well as their ability to give due attention to inexperienced actors such as himself.  Earlier, in a 2002 interview, Hickman stated that the current generation of young Hollywood actors was talented, but lacked the proper coaching and ambition.

Personal life
Hickman married actress Pamela Lincoln, with whom he had acted in the movie The Tingler, on November 28, 1959. The couple, who had two sons, divorced in 1982. Their younger son, Justin, committed suicide at the age of 19 in 1985.

Selected filmography

Features

Short films
 Coffins on Wheels (1941) – Billy Phillips
 Heart Burn (1942) – Nephew
 Going to Press (1942) – Frank
 Boogie Woogie (1945) – Junior Stumplefinger

References

Bibliography
 Holmstrom, John. The Moving Picture Boy: An International Encyclopaedia from 1895 to 1995, Norwich, Michael Russell, 1996, pp. 169–170.
 Best, Marc. Those Endearing Young Charms: Child Performers of the Screen, South Brunswick and New York: Barnes & Co., 1971, pp. 105–110.

External links

 
 
 
 Darryl Hickman at the American Film Institute
 2009 Half-Hour TV Interview on The Creative Community

1931 births
Living people
American acting coaches
American male child actors
American male film actors
American male television actors
American male voice actors
American television executives
Male actors from Los Angeles
Military personnel from California
Paramount Pictures contract players
People from Hollywood, Los Angeles
20th-century American male actors